Clytia is a variant of Clytie, the name of several figures in Greek mythology.

Clytia or Klytia or Clytie may also refer to:

Biology
 Clytia (hydrozoan), a genus of hydrozoans in the family Campanulariidae
 Clytia, a spelling variant of the Euphorbiaceae genus Clutia 
 Clytie (moth), a genus of moths

Others 
 USS Clytie (AS-26), United States Navy during World War II
 73 Klytia, an asteroid